In computational geometry, Chan's algorithm, named after Timothy M. Chan, is an optimal output-sensitive algorithm to compute the convex hull of a set  of  points, in 2- or 3-dimensional space. 
The algorithm takes  time, where  is the number of vertices of the output (the convex hull). In the planar case, the algorithm combines an  algorithm (Graham scan, for example) with Jarvis march, in order to obtain an optimal  time. Chan's algorithm is notable because it is much simpler than the Kirkpatrick–Seidel algorithm, and it naturally extends to 3-dimensional space. This paradigm has been independently developed by Frank Nielsen in his Ph.D. thesis.

Algorithm

Overview
Ideally,  but , the number of vertices in the output convex hull, is not known at the start.

The algorithm starts by arbitrarily partitioning the set of points  into  subsets  with at most  points each; notice that .

For each subset , it computes the convex hull, using an  algorithm (for example, Graham scan), where  is the number of points in the subset. As there are  subsets of  points each, this phase takes  time.

During the second phase, Jarvis's march is executed, making use of the precomputed (mini) convex hulls, . Then, we can determine  using the same technique as normally used in Jarvis's march, but only considering the points  (i.e. the points in the mini convex hulls) instead of the whole set .

By running the two phases described above, the convex hull of  points is computed in  time.

Choosing the parameter 
In that case, after  steps in the second phase, we interrupt the Jarvis's march as running it to the end would take too much time.
At that moment, a  time will have been spent, and the convex hull will not have been calculated.

Squaring Strategy 

Starting from a value of 2, at iteration ,  is chosen. In that case,  iterations are made, given that the algorithm terminates once we have

with the logarithm taken in base , and the total running time of the algorithm is

In three dimensions
To generalize this construction for the 3-dimensional case, an  algorithm to compute the 3-dimensional convex hull by Preparata and Hong should be used instead of Graham scan, and a 3-dimensional version of Jarvis's march needs to be used. The time complexity remains .

Pseudocode

In the following pseudocode, text between parentheses and in italic are comments. To fully understand the following pseudocode, it is recommended that the reader is already familiar with Graham scan and Jarvis march algorithms to compute the convex hull, of a set of points,
.

Input: Set  with  points .

 (This operation takes  time: e.g., we can simply iterate through .)

( is used in the Jarvis march part of this Chan's algorithm,
(For more info, see the comments close to the corresponding part of the Chan's algorithm.)

 (More specifically, we want , so that not to perform too many unnecessary iterations
 (As explained above in this article, a strategy is used where at most  iterations are required to find .)
 (Nevertheless, this Chan's algorithm stops once  iterations of the outermost loop are performed,
 that is, even if , it doesn't perform  iterations of the outermost loop.)
 (For more info, see the Jarvis march part of this algorithm below, where  is returned if .)
for  do
 (Set parameter  for the current iteration. A "squaring scheme" is used as described above in this article.
 

 
 

 (Arbitrarily split set of points  into  subsets of roughly  elements each.)

 (Compute the convex hull of all  subsets of points, .)
 (It takes  time.)
for  do
 ( is the convex hull of the subset of points .)
 

 (At this point, the convex hulls  of respectively the subsets of points  have been computed.)
 (Given that Jarvis march is an output-sensitive algorithm, its running time depends on the size of the convex hull, .)
 (In practice, it means that Jarvis march performs  iterations of its outermost loop.
 At each of these iterations, it performs at most  iterations of its innermost loop.)
 (We want , so we do not want to perform more than  iterations in the following outer loop.)
, the convex hull of  cannot be found.)
 (In this modified version of Jarvis march, we perform an operation inside the innermost loop which takes  time.
 Hence, the total time complexity of this modified version is
 
for  do

 (Each of these  possible next points is from a different :
 for  do
 ( finds the point  such that the angle  is maximized ,
 (Angles do not need to be calculated directly: the orientation test can be used .)
 ( can be performed in  time.)
 

 

 (Jarvis march terminates when the next selected point on the convext hull, is the initial point, .)
if 
 return 
else

 (If after  iterations a point  has not been found so that , then .) 

Implementation

Chan's paper contains several suggestions that may improve the practical performance of the algorithm, for example:

 When computing the convex hulls of the subsets, eliminate the points that are not in the convex hull from consideration in subsequent executions.
 The convex hulls of larger point sets can be obtained by merging previously calculated convex hulls, instead of recomputing from scratch.
 With the above idea, the dominant cost of algorithm lies in the pre-processing, i.e., the computation of the convex hulls of the groups. To reduce this cost, we may consider reusing hulls computed from the previous iteration and merging them as the group size is increased.

Extensions
Chan's paper contains some other problems whose known algorithms can be made optimal output sensitive using his technique, for example:

 Computing the lower envelope  of a set  of  line segments, which is defined as the lower boundary  of the unbounded trapezoid of formed by the intersections.
 
  Constructing output sensitive algorithms for higher dimensional convex hulls.

See also
 Convex hull algorithms

References

 

Convex hull algorithms